Interstate 80N is a former designation in Ohio.  It ran along what is now the following highways (Italics denote never-built roads):
  from near Milan to Elyria
  alone from Elyria to Cleveland
  The entire length of I-490
  A short portion of unbuilt I-290
  A section of unbuilt highway connecting to Interstate 480
  from Maple Heights to I-480's east terminus
  A section of unbuilt highway connecting to mainline I-80, which is now Interstate 76
  Interstate 80N ended at a junction with the mainline route of I-80 around Ravenna. The road at which I-80N ended is now Interstate 76.

See also

 List of Interstate Highways in Ohio

External links

80N
N (Ohio)
Cleveland area expressways
Transportation in Cleveland
80N